Marcelo Ferreira Martins (born 7 November 1975) is a Brazilian and naturalized Honduran former football player.

He is currently the fifth all time top scorer in the Honduran Liga Nacional with a total of 94 goals. Now he lives in Honduras. Ferreira along with Denilson Costa are among the only naturalized Honduran nationals to have played for the Honduras national football team.

Club career
Ferreira was born in Brazil. He came to Honduras in 1997, by recommendation of José de la Paz Herrera. His first team was Broncos UNAH in 1999. His brilliant performance in Broncos made him go to Olimpia. In the 2001-02 Clausura, he was transferred to Platense. During his two tournaments in Platense, Ferreira scored a total of 28 goals. He went back in 2003 to Olimpia. After 2 years, he was contracted by F.C. Motagua for the 2005-06 Apertura. He scored 8 goals for Motagua during the two tournaments.  After Motagua, Ferreira went to Atlético Olanchano for the 2006-07 season. Ferreira scored 11 goals during the season. In the 2007-08 Apertura, C.D. Marathón signed Marcelo Ferreira. Ferreira didn't have an acceptable performance, scoring only 3 goals. He then moved to Platense, six years after his first spell at this team. This time, Ferreira had a poor performance. He made only 2 goals. For 2009 he signed for Parrillas One in the Liga de Ascenso de Honduras.

References

1975 births
Living people
Brazilian footballers
Honduran footballers
Honduras international footballers
C.D. Broncos players
C.D. Olimpia players
Platense F.C. players
F.C. Motagua players
Atlético Olanchano players
C.D. Marathón players
Liga Nacional de Fútbol Profesional de Honduras players
Honduran expatriate footballers
Expatriate footballers in Guatemala
Cobán Imperial players
Association football forwards